This is a list of palaces and mansions in Békés County in Hungary.

List of palaces and mansions in Békés County

See also
 List of palaces and mansions in Hungary
 List of castles in Hungary

Literature
 Zsolt Virág : Magyar Kastélylexikon - Békés megye kastélyai, 2006

References

Békés County
Houses in Hungary